Comberbach is a civil parish in Cheshire West and Chester, England.   Apart from the village of Comberbach, the parish is entirely rural, and contains six buildings that are recorded in the National Heritage List for England as designated listed buildings.  The buildings are all domestic or related to farming.

Key

Buildings

See also
Listed buildings in Anderton with Marbury
Listed buildings in Antrobus
Listed buildings in Barnton
Listed buildings in Great Budworth
Listed buildings in Little Leigh
Listed buildings in Whitley

References
Citations

Sources

Listed buildings in Cheshire West and Chester
Lists of listed buildings in Cheshire